"Glorious Day (Living He Loved Me)" is a song performed by contemporary Christian band Casting Crowns from their 2009 album Until the Whole World Hears. While the music was composed by the band, the lyrics come from the hymn "One Day", written in 1910 by John Wilbur Chapman during the second summer conference of the Stony Brook Assembly in Stony Brook, NY. The song's verse melody was set by Michael Bleecker at The Village Church in Flower Mound, Texas. The single has been successful on Christian radio, reaching the top spot on the Hot Christian Songs (for a total of nine non-consecutive weeks), Soft AC/Inspirational, and Christian AC charts. The song has also achieved some inroads on secular charts, peaked at #2 on the Bubbling Under Hot 100 Singles chart.

"Glorious Day (Living He Loved Me)" is also appears on the compilation album WOW Hits 2012.

Charts

Weekly charts

Year-end charts

Decade-end charts

Certifications

References

Casting Crowns songs
2011 singles
Songs written by Mark Hall (musician)